Killing Rommel is a 2008 historical fiction novel by Steven Pressfield set in North Africa during World War II.  The book follows the actions of the British Long Range Desert Group (LRDG).

Story

The novel begins with the narrator recounting the story of a man named Chapman, who had been schooling in England when the war broke out.  He joined the British army and found himself fighting hopelessly against the Germans in North Africa.  The Germans were said to have superior leadership, tactics, and equipment, including their much more able tanks.  Despite the British struggles to fight off the Germans, at some intervals they find success.  However, the leadership of Erwin Rommel is the main driving force of German success and so long as he is around, the allies cannot expect to make much headway.

Chapman volunteers to join the LRDG in his desire to see more action.  He joins a motley squadron of Brits, Australians, and New Zealanders, along with other men from commonwealth nations.  Also there are some Arab natives who tag along as both guides and warriors.  Chapman's squadron is given orders to navigate across barren deserts, find Rommel when he is vulnerable and unsuspecting, and assassinate him.

The group experiences many trials as it travels through hundreds of miles of barren desert, dealing with sickness, fatigue, dehydration, overheating trucks, Axis patrols, and more perils.  It is an epic journey of a soldiers overcoming hardship and uniting in fraternity.

Themes

In this novel Pressfield presents some of the themes seen before in his works, both fiction and non-fiction.  A major motif is the growth and evolution of the individual from "archetype to archetype" through trials.  The novel also depicts the 'Warrior Code' that has been a major theme of most of his works and is explicitly outlined in his book The Warrior Ethos.

References

2008 American novels
Novels set during World War II
Novels set in Africa